Nikolai Vasilyevich Dolgov (born 9 December 1946, in Oryol) is a Russian football manager and a former player.

Honours
 Soviet Top League winner: 1970.

International career
Dolgov made his debut for USSR on 17 February 1971 in a friendly against Mexico.

External links
  Profile

1946 births
Living people
Soviet footballers
Soviet Union international footballers
Russian football managers
Soviet Top League players
FC Spartak Moscow players
PFC CSKA Moscow players
Soviet expatriate footballers
Expatriate footballers in East Germany
Sportspeople from Oryol
FC Oryol players
FC Oryol managers
Association football forwards